The Sporting Duchess is a 1915 American silent drama film directed by Barry O'Neil and starring Rose Coghlan and Ethel Clayton. It was produced by the Lubin Manufacturing Company.

The film was remade by Vitagraph Studios in 1920 with Alice Joyce in the title role.

Cast

Preservation
With no prints of The Sporting Duchess located in any film archives, it is a lost film.

References

External links

1915 films
American silent feature films
Lost American films
Lubin Manufacturing Company films
American films based on plays
American black-and-white films
Silent American drama films
1915 drama films
1915 lost films
Lost drama films
Films directed by Barry O'Neil
1910s American films
1910s English-language films